Robinsonekspedisjonen is a popular Norwegian reality television program debuting in 1999. In the fall of 1998 TV3 purchased the broadcast rights to air their own version of Expedition Robinson. The name alludes to both Robinson Crusoe and The Swiss Family Robinson, two stories featuring people marooned by shipwrecks.

Norway was one of the first countries to adopt the Robinson format following its success in both Sweden and Denmark. While it has never achieved as high of ratings as that of Denmark and Sweden's versions of the show, it is still considered a ratings success.

Following a two year hiatus after the VIP season with Denmark and Sweden, Robinsonekspedisjonen returned in 2007 and has seen a season over season ratings growth since.

Format
The Robinson format was developed by Planet 24, a British TV production company owned by Charlie Parsons and Bob Geldof. Their company Castaway Television Productions retained the rights to the concept when they sold Planet 24 in 1999. Mark Burnett later licensed the format to create the American show Survivor in 2000.

Sixteen contestants are put into a survival situation and compete in a variety of physical challenges. Early in each season two teams compete but later on the teams are merged and the competitions become individual. At the end of each show one contestant is eliminated from the show by the others in a secret "island council" ballot.

Seasons

External links
 http://www.tv3.no/robinson/forside
 http://arkiv.na24.no/

 
Norwegian reality television series
Norway
TV3 (Norway) original programming
1999 Norwegian television series debuts